Hákonarson is a Scandinavian surname. Notable people with the surname include:

Einar Hákonarson (born 1945), Icelandic artist, an expressionistic and figurative painter
Eiríkr Hákonarson (960s–1020s), earl of Lade, ruler of Norway and earl of Northumbria
Grímur Hákonarson (born 1977), Icelandic film director
Sveinn Hákonarson (died 1016), earl of the house of Hlaðir and co-ruler of Norway from 1000 to c. 1015